Beate Renschler (born 2 September 1958) is a German gymnast. She competed in six events at the 1976 Summer Olympics.

References

External links
 

1958 births
Living people
German female artistic gymnasts
Olympic gymnasts of West Germany
Gymnasts at the 1976 Summer Olympics
People from Rastatt
Sportspeople from Karlsruhe (region)